Tri-County Regional Airport  is a public use airport in Sauk County, Wisconsin, United States. It is located two nautical miles (4 km) north of the central business district of Lone Rock, a village in Richland County, Wisconsin. The airport is owned by the Wisconsin counties of Sauk, Iowa and Richland. It is included in the Federal Aviation Administration (FAA) National Plan of Integrated Airport Systems for 2021–2025, in which it is categorized as a local general aviation facility.

Facilities and aircraft 
Tri-County Regional Airport covers an area of 225 acres (90 ha) at an elevation of 717 feet (219 m) above mean sea level. It has two runways with asphalt surfaces: 9/27 is 5,000 by 75 feet (1,524 x 23 m) and 18/36 is 1,850 by 60 feet (564 x 18 m).

For the 12-month period ending September 26, 2022, the airport had 16,000 aircraft operations, an average of 44 per day: 96% general aviation, 3% air taxi and 1% military. In January 2023, there were 29 aircraft based at this airport: 27 single-engine, 1 multi-engine and 1 jet.

See also 
 List of airports in Wisconsin

References

External links 
 Tri-County Regional Airport at Sauk County web site
   at Wisconsin DOT Airport Directory
 Aerial image as of May 1992 from USGS The National Map
 

Airports in Wisconsin
Airports in Sauk County, Wisconsin